Cortelazor is a town located in the province of Huelva, Spain. According to the 2005 census, it has a population of 289 inhabitants and covers an area of forty square kilometres. It sits at an altitude of 622 metres above sea level, and is 120 kilometres from the capital.

References

External links
Cortelazor - Sistema de Información Multiterritorial de Andalucía

Municipalities in the Province of Huelva